The West Riverdale Historic District is a national historic district located at Riverdale Park, Prince George's County, Maryland, a railroad suburb located northeast of Washington, D.C.  The neighborhood was appended to the town of Riverdale Park soon after it was laid out and platted in 1906, and later enlarged in 1937. The district is defined by a modest variety of architectural styles and building types ranging from early-20th century vernacular interpretations of popular styles to diluted, suburbanized examples of revival styles that dominated the second quarter of the 20th century. These styles represent modest examples of Queen Anne, Colonial Revival, Spanish Colonial Revival, Craftsman, and Tudor Revival forms. At the center of the community is the former Eugene Leland Memorial Hospital, now known as the Crescent Cities Health and Rehabilitation Center.

It was listed on the National Register of Historic Places in 2002.

References

External links
, including photo in 2001, at Maryland Historical Trust website
Boundary Map of the West Riverdale Historic District, Prince George's County, at Maryland Historical Trust

Historic districts in Prince George's County, Maryland
Queen Anne architecture in Maryland
Colonial Revival architecture in Maryland
Tudor Revival architecture in Maryland
Spanish Revival architecture in the United States
Houses on the National Register of Historic Places in Maryland
Historic districts on the National Register of Historic Places in Maryland
Houses in Prince George's County, Maryland
National Register of Historic Places in Prince George's County, Maryland